The General William Henry Harrison Headquarters is a historic building in the East Franklinton neighborhood of Columbus, Ohio. It was listed on the National Register of Historic Places in 1972 and the Columbus Register of Historic Properties (along with the Sullivant Land Office) in 1985. The brick house was built in 1807 by Jacob Oberdier, one of Franklinton's first settlers. The house became especially important to the area from 1813 to 1814, when General William Henry Harrison, later the 9th President of the United States, used the house as his headquarters. It is the only remaining building in Ohio associated with Harrison.

See also
 National Register of Historic Places listings in Columbus, Ohio

References

External links
 

Houses on the National Register of Historic Places in Ohio
Federal architecture in Ohio
Houses completed in 1807
Houses in Columbus, Ohio
National Register of Historic Places in Columbus, Ohio
Franklinton (Columbus, Ohio)
Columbus Register properties
Vernacular architecture in Ohio
Broad Street (Columbus, Ohio)
William Henry Harrison